Maple Grove is an unincorporated community and census-designated place in Benzie County in the U.S. state of Michigan. The population was 132 at the 2010 census.  Maple Grove is located within Almira Township.

Geography
Maple Grove is located in southeastern Almira Township in northeastern Benzie County. The CDP is located on the south shore of Lake Ann just south of the village of Lake Ann.

History
The community of Maple Grove was listed as a newly-organized census-designated place for the 2010 census, meaning it now has officially defined boundaries and population statistics for the first time.

Demographics

References

Traverse City micropolitan area
Census-designated places in Michigan
Unincorporated communities in Benzie County, Michigan
Unincorporated communities in Michigan
Census-designated places in Benzie County, Michigan